Jamal Naji,  (1 November 1954 – 6 May 2018) was a Jordanian author of Palestinian origins. He was born in 1954 in the refugee camp of Aqbat Jaber in the West Bank. He moved to Jordan in 1967, when he was in his early teens.

Naji began writing in his early twenties, and published his first novel The Road to Balharith in 1981–82. Since then he had written several more novels as well as short story collections and television scripts. His recent novel When the Wolves Grow Old was shortlisted for the Arabic Booker Prize in 2010.

He was the president of the Jordanian Writers Association from 2001 to 2003. He lived and worked in Amman, Jordan.

References

1954 births
2018 deaths
People from Amman
Jordanian writers
Palestinian novelists
Palestinian emigrants to Jordan